Toyei is a census-designated place (CDP) in Apache County, Arizona, United States.  The population was 13 at the 2010 census.

Geography
Toyei is located at  (35.70251, −109.93817).

Education
It is in the Ganado Unified School District, which operates Ganado High School.

There was previously a Bureau of Indian Affairs (BIA) boarding school at Toyei. In 1979 Molly Ivins wrote that "The Toyei school used to be cited for its model dormitory program, but that has been discontinued."

Demographics

References

External links
  – 
 USGS map of Toyei Boarding School

Census-designated places in Apache County, Arizona
Populated places on the Navajo Nation
Census-designated places in Arizona